Glubokovsky is a rural locality (a khutor) in Kletsko-Pochtovskoye Rural Settlement, Serafimovichsky District, Volgograd Oblast, Russia. The population was 2 as of 2010.

Geography 
Glubokovsky is located 96 km southeast of Serafimovich (the district's administrative centre) by road. Krasnoyarsky is the nearest rural locality.

References 

Rural localities in Serafimovichsky District